Kouvolan Sanomat is a morning broadsheet newspaper in tabloid format published in Kouvola, Finland.

History and profile
Kouvolan Sanomat was established in 1909. The paper is published by Sanoma Lehtimedia Oy which also publishes Etelä-Saimaa, Kymen Sanomat and Uutisvuoksi.

Kouvolan Sanomat had a circulation of 27,959 copies in 2009.

References

External links
Official site

1909 establishments in Finland
Publications established in 1909
Daily newspapers published in Finland
Finnish-language newspapers